Ashby by Partney is a hamlet in the East Lindsey district of Lincolnshire, England. It neighbours the village of Partney, and forms part of the civil parish of Ashby with Scremby.

The settlement is recorded in the Domesday Book as consisting of 26 households, with Earl Hugh of Chester as Lord of the Manor.

The church, dedicated to Saint Helen, was built of pale orange brick in 1841, on the site of an earlier church. C. Hodgson Fowler restored the interior in 1892, retaining the 14th-century font. It is a Grade II listed building.

References

External links
 
 

Hamlets in Lincolnshire
East Lindsey District